Fakhreddine Jaziri (born 25 January 1989) is a Tunisian football midfielder who currently plays for Club Africain.

References

1989 births
Living people
Tunisian footballers
CA Bizertin players
EGS Gafsa players
Club Africain players
Association football midfielders
Tunisian Ligue Professionnelle 1 players
Footballers from Tunis